

Peerage of England

|rowspan="2"|Duke of Cornwall (1337)||none||1514||1537||
|-
|Edward Tudor||1537||1547||
|-
|Duke of Norfolk (1483)||Thomas Howard, 3rd Duke of Norfolk||1524||1547||
|-
|Duke of Suffolk (1514)||Charles Brandon, 1st Duke of Suffolk||1514||1545||
|-
|Duke of Richmond and Somerset (1525)||Henry FitzRoy, 1st Duke of Richmond and Somerset||1525||1536||Died; title extinct
|-
|rowspan="2"|Marquess of Dorset (1475)||Thomas Grey, 2nd Marquess of Dorset||1501||1530||Died
|-
|Henry Grey, 3rd Marquess of Dorset||1530||1554||
|-
|Marquess of Exeter (1525)||Henry Courtenay, 1st Marquess of Exeter||1525||1539||Attainted, and his honours were forfeited
|-
|Marquess of Pembroke (1532)||Anne Boleyn, 1st Marchioness of Pembroke||1532||1536||New creation; attainted, and the peerage became forfeited
|-
|Earl of Arundel (1138)||William FitzAlan, 18th Earl of Arundel||1524||1544||
|-
|Earl of Oxford (1142)||John de Vere, 15th Earl of Oxford||1526||1540||
|-
|Earl of Salisbury (1337)||Margaret Pole, Countess of Salisbury||1513||1539||Attainted, and her honours were forfeited
|-
|Earl of Westmorland (1397)||Ralph Neville, 4th Earl of Westmorland||1499||1549||
|-
|Earl of Northumberland (1416)||Henry Percy, 6th Earl of Northumberland||1527||1537||Died, his honours were considered incapable of passing through an attainted person, and thus became forfeited
|-
|rowspan="2"|Earl of Shrewsbury (1442)||George Talbot, 4th Earl of Shrewsbury||1473||1538||Died
|-
|Francis Talbot, 5th Earl of Shrewsbury||1538||1560||
|-
|Earl of Essex (1461)||Henry Bourchier, 2nd Earl of Essex||1483||1540||
|-
|Earl of Kent (1465)||Henry Grey, 4th Earl of Kent||1524||1562||
|-
|Earl of Derby (1485)||Edward Stanley, 3rd Earl of Derby||1521||1572||
|-
|Earl of Worcester (1514)||Henry Somerset, 2nd Earl of Worcester||1526||1549||
|-
|Earl of Cumberland (1525)||Henry Clifford, 1st Earl of Cumberland||1525||1542||
|-
|Earl of Rutland (1525)||Thomas Manners, 1st Earl of Rutland||1525||1543||
|-
|Earl of Lincoln (1525)||Henry Brandon, 1st Earl of Lincoln||1525||1534||Died, title extinct
|-
|Earl of Huntington (1529)||George Hastings, 1st Earl of Huntingdon||1529||1544||
|-
|Earl of Wiltshire (1529)||Thomas Boleyn, 1st Earl of Wiltshire||1529||1539||Died, title extinct
|-
|Earl of Sussex (1529)||Robert Radcliffe, 1st Earl of Sussex||1529||1542||
|-
|rowspan="2"|Earl of Bath (1536)||John Bourchier, 1st Earl of Bath||1536||1539||New creation; died
|-
|John Bourchier, 2nd Earl of Bath||1539||1561||
|-
|Earl of Hertford (1537)||Edward Seymour, 1st Earl of Hertford||1537||1551||New creation; Viscount Beauchamp in 1536
|-
|Earl of Southampton (1537)||William FitzWilliam, 1st Earl of Southampton||1537||1542||New creation
|-
|Earl of Bridgewater (1538)||Henry Daubeney, 1st Earl of Bridgewater||1538||1548||New creation
|-
|Viscount Lisle (1523)||Arthur Plantagenet, 1st Viscount Lisle||1523||1542||
|-
|Baron FitzWarin (1295)||John Bourchier, 11th Baron FitzWarin||1479||1539||Created Earl of Bath in 1536, Barony held by his heirs until 1636, when it fell into abeyance
|- 
|Baron Grey de Wilton (1295)||William Grey, 13th Baron Grey de Wilton||1520||1562||
|-
|Baron Clinton (1299)||Edward Clinton, 9th Baron Clinton||1517||1585||
|- 
|Baron De La Warr (1299)||Thomas West, 9th Baron De La Warr||1525||1554||
|- 
|Baron Ferrers of Chartley (1299)||Walter Devereux, 10th Baron Ferrers of Chartley||1501||1558||
|- 
|Baron Morley (1299)||Henry Parker, 10th Baron Morley||1518||1556||
|- 
|Baron Zouche of Haryngworth (1308)||John la Zouche, 8th Baron Zouche||1526||1550||
|- 
|Baron Audley of Heleigh (1313)||John Tuchet, 8th Baron Audley||1512||1557||
|- 
|Baron Cobham of Kent (1313)||George Brooke, 9th Baron Cobham||1529||1558||
|- 
|Baron Willoughby de Eresby (1313)||Catherine Willoughby, 12th Baroness Willoughby de Eresby||1526||1580||
|- 
|rowspan="2"|Baron Dacre (1321)||Thomas Fiennes, 8th Baron Dacre||1486||1534||Died
|- 
|Thomas Fiennes, 9th Baron Dacre||1534||1541||
|- 
|Baron Greystock (1321)||William Dacre, 7th Baron Greystoke||1516||1563||
|- 
|Baron Harington (1326)||Cecily Bonville, 7th Baroness Harington||1460||1530||Title succeeded by the Marquess of Dorset, and held by his heir, until 1554, when all his titles became forfeited
|- 
|rowspan="2"|Baron Scrope of Bolton (1371)||Henry Scrope, 7th Baron Scrope of Bolton||1506||1533||Died
|- 
|John Scrope, 8th Baron Scrope of Bolton||1533||1549||
|- 
|Baron Lumley (1384)||John Lumley, 5th Baron Lumley||1510||1545||
|- 
|rowspan="2"|Baron Bergavenny (1392)||George Nevill, 5th Baron Bergavenny||1492||1536||Died
|- 
|Henry Nevill, 6th Baron Bergavenny||1536||1585||
|- 
|rowspan="3"|Baron Berkeley (1421)||Thomas Berkeley, 5th Baron Berkeley||1523||1533||Died
|- 
|Thomas Berkeley, 6th Baron Berkeley||1533||1534||
|- 
|Henry Berkeley, 7th Baron Berkeley||1534||1613||
|- 
|rowspan="2"|Baron Latimer (1432)||Richard Neville, 2nd Baron Latimer||1469||1530||Died
|- 
|John Neville, 3rd Baron Latimer||1530||1543||
|- 
|rowspan="2"|Baron Dudley (1440)||Edward Sutton, 2nd Baron Dudley||1487||1532||Died
|- 
|John Sutton, 3rd Baron Dudley||1532||1553||
|- 
|Baron Saye and Sele (1447)||Richard Fiennes, 6th Baron Saye and Sele||1528||1573||
|- 
|rowspan="2"|Baron Stourton (1448)||Edward Stourton, 6th Baron Stourton||1523||1535||Died
|- 
|William Stourton, 7th Baron Stourton||1535||1548||
|- 
|Baron Berners (1455)||John Bourchier, 2nd Baron Berners||1474||1533||Died, Barony became dormant
|- 
|rowspan="2"|Baron Ogle (1461)||Robert Ogle, 4th Baron Ogle||1513||1530||Died
|- 
|Robert Ogle, 5th Baron Ogle||1530||1545||
|- 
|rowspan="2"|Baron Mountjoy (1465)||William Blount, 4th Baron Mountjoy||1485||1534||Died
|- 
|Charles Blount, 5th Baron Mountjoy||1534||1544||
|- 
|Baron Grey of Powis (1482)||Edward Grey, 3rd Baron Grey of Powis||1504||1552||
|- 
|Baron Daubeney (1486)||Henry Daubeney, 2nd Baron Daubeney||1507||1548||Created Earl of Bridgewater in 1538, see above
|- 
|Baron Willoughby de Broke (1491)||Elizabeth Willoughby, 3rd Baroness Willoughby de Broke||1535||1562||Abeyance terminated in 1535
|- 
|rowspan="2"|Baron Conyers (1509)||Christopher Conyers, 2nd Baron Conyers||1524||1538||Died
|- 
|John Conyers, 3rd Baron Conyers||1538||1557||
|- 
|Baron Darcy de Darcy (1509)||Thomas Darcy, 1st Baron Darcy de Darcy||1509||1538||Attainted, and his honours were forfeited
|- 
|Baron Montagu (1514)||Henry Pole, 1st Baron Montagu||1513||1539||Attainted, and his honours became forfeited
|-
|Baron Monteagle (1514)||Thomas Stanley, 2nd Baron Monteagle||1523||1560||
|-
|Baron Vaux of Harrowden (1523)||Thomas Vaux, 2nd Baron Vaux of Harrowden||1523||1556||
|-
|Baron Sandys of the Vine (1529)||William Sandys, 1st Baron Sandys||1529||1540||
|-
|rowspan="2"|Baron Braye (1529)||Edmund Braye, 1st Baron Braye||1529||1539||Died
|-
|John Braye, 2nd Baron Braye||1539||1557||
|-
|Baron Burgh (1529)||Thomas Burgh, 1st Baron Burgh||1529||1550||
|-
|rowspan="2"|Baron Tailboys (1529)||Gilbert Tailboys, 1st Baron Tailboys of Kyme||1529||1530||Died
|-
|George Tailboys, 2nd Baron Tailboys of Kyme||1530||1540||
|-
|Baron Windsor (1529)||Andrew Windsor, 1st Baron Windsor||1529||1543||
|-
|Baron Hussey (1529)||John Hussey, 1st Baron Hussey of Sleaford||1529||1537||Attainted, Barony became forfeited
|-
|Baron Wentworth (1529)||Thomas Wentworth, 1st Baron Wentworth||1529||1551||
|-
|Baron Mordaunt (1532)||John Mordaunt, 1st Baron Mordaunt||1532||1562||New creation
|-
|Baron Cromwell (1536)||Thomas Cromwell, 1st Baron Cromwell||1536||1540||New creation
|-
|Baron Audley of Walden (1538)||Thomas Audley, 1st Baron Audley of Walden||1538||1244||New creation
|-
|Baron St John of Basing (1539)||William Paulet, 1st Baron St John of Basing||1539||1572||New creation
|-
|Baron Parr (1539)||William Parr, 1st Baron Parr||1539||1571||New creation
|-
|}

Peerage of Scotland

|Duke of Rothesay (1398)||none||1513||1540||
|-
|Duke of Albany (1456)||John Stewart, Duke of Albany||1515||1536||Died, title extinct
|-
|rowspan=2|Earl of Sutherland (1235)||Elizabeth de Moravia, 10th Countess of Sutherland||1514||1535||Died
|-
|John Gordon, 11th Earl of Sutherland||1535||1567||
|-
|Earl of Angus (1389)||Archibald Douglas, 6th Earl of Angus||1513||1557||
|-
|Earl of Crawford (1398)||David Lindsay, 8th Earl of Crawford||1517||1542||
|-
|rowspan=2|Earl of Menteith (1427)||Alexander Graham, 2nd Earl of Menteith||1490||1537||Died
|-
|William Graham, 3rd Earl of Menteith||1537||1543||
|-
|Earl of Huntly (1445)||George Gordon, 4th Earl of Huntly||1524||1562||
|-
|Earl of Erroll (1452)||William Hay, 5th Earl of Erroll||1513||1541||
|-
|Earl of Caithness (1455)||George Sinclair, 4th Earl of Caithness||1529||1582||
|-
|Earl of Argyll (1457)||Archibald Campbell, 4th Earl of Argyll||1529||1558||
|-
|Earl of Atholl (1457)||John Stewart, 3rd Earl of Atholl||1521||1542||
|-
|Earl of Morton (1458)||James Douglas, 3rd Earl of Morton||1513||1548||
|-
|Earl of Rothes (1458)||George Leslie, 4th Earl of Rothes||1513||1558||
|-
|rowspan=2|Earl Marischal (1458)||William Keith, 3rd Earl Marischal||1483||1530||Died
|-
|William Keith, 4th Earl Marischal||1530||1581||
|-
|Earl of Buchan (1469)||John Stewart, 3rd Earl of Buchan||1505||1551||
|-
|Earl of Glencairn (1488)||Cuthbert Cunningham, 3rd Earl of Glencairn||1490||1541||
|-
|Earl of Bothwell (1488)||Patrick Hepburn, 3rd Earl of Bothwell||1513||1556||
|-
|Earl of Lennox (1488)||Matthew Stewart, 4th Earl of Lennox||1526||1571||
|-
|Earl of Moray (1501)||James Stewart, 1st Earl of Moray||1501||1544||
|-
|Earl of Arran (1503)||James Hamilton, 2nd Earl of Arran||1529||1575||
|-
|Earl of Montrose (1503)||William Graham, 2nd Earl of Montrose||1513||1571||
|-
|Earl of Eglinton (1507)||Hugh Montgomerie, 1st Earl of Eglinton||1507||1545||
|-
|Earl of Cassilis (1509)||Gilbert Kennedy, 3rd Earl of Cassilis||1527||1558||
|-
|Lord Erskine (1429)||John Erskine, 5th Lord Erskine||1513||1552||de jure Earl of Mar
|-
|Lord Somerville (1430)||Hugh Somerville, 5th Lord Somerville||1523||1549||
|-
|Lord Haliburton of Dirleton (1441)||Janet Haliburton, 7th Lady Haliburton of Dirleton||1502||1560||
|-
|Lord Forbes (1442)||John Forbes, 6th Lord Forbes||1493||1547||
|-
|Lord Maxwell (1445)||Robert Maxwell, 5th Lord Maxwell||1513||1546||
|-
|Lord Glamis (1445)||John Lyon, 7th Lord Glamis||1528||1558||
|-
|Lord Lindsay of the Byres (1445)||John Lindsay, 5th Lord Lindsay||1526||1563||
|-
|Lord Saltoun (1445)||William Abernethy, 5th Lord Saltoun||1527||1543||
|-
|Lord Gray (1445)||Patrick Gray, 3rd Lord Grayy||1514||1541||
|-
|Lord Sinclair (1449)||William Sinclair, 4th Lord Sinclair||1513||1570||
|-
||Lord Fleming (1451)||Malcolm Fleming, 3rd Lord Fleming||1524||1547||
|-
|Lord Seton (1451)||George Seton, 6th Lord Seton||1513||1549||
|-
|Lord Borthwick (1452)||William Borthwick, 4th Lord Borthwick||1513||1542||
|-
|Lord Boyd (1454)||Robert Boyd, 4th Lord Boyd||Aft. 1508||1558||
|-
|Lord Oliphant (1455)||Laurence Oliphant, 3rd Lord Oliphant||1516||1566||
|-
|Lord Livingston (1458)||Alexander Livingston, 5th Lord Livingston||1518||1553||
|-
|rowspan=2|Lord Cathcart (1460)||John Cathcart, 2nd Lord Cathcart||1497||1535||Died
|-
|Alan Cathcart, 3rd Lord Cathcart||1535||1547||
|-
|Lord Lovat (1464)||Hugh Fraser, 3rd Lord Lovat||1524||1544||
|-
|rowspan=2|Lord Innermeath (1470)||Richard Stewart, 3rd Lord Innermeath||1513||1532||Died
|-
|John Stewart, 4th Lord Innermeath||1532||1569||
|-
|Lord Carlyle of Torthorwald (1473)||Michael Carlyle, 4th Lord Carlyle||1526||1575||
|-
|Lord Home (1473)||George Home, 4th Lord Home||1516||1549||
|-
|Lord Ruthven (1488)||William Ruthven, 2nd Lord Ruthven||1528||1552||
|-
|rowspan=2|Lord Crichton of Sanquhar (1488)||Robert Crichton, 4th Lord Crichton of Sanquhar||1516-20||1536||Died
|-
|William Crichton, 5th Lord Crichton of Sanquhar||1536||1550||
|-
|Lord Drummond of Cargill (1488)||David Drummond, 2nd Lord Drummond||1519||1571||
|-
|Lord Hay of Yester (1488)||John Hay, 3rd Lord Hay of Yester||1513||1543||
|-
|Lord Sempill (1489)||William Sempill, 2nd Lord Sempill||1513||1552||
|-
|Lord Herries of Terregles (1490)||William Herries, 3rd Lord Herries of Terregles||1513||1543||
|-
|Lord Ogilvy of Airlie (1491)||James Ogilvy, 4th Lord Ogilvy of Airlie||1524||1549||
|-
|Lord Ross (1499)||Ninian Ross, 3rd Lord Ross||1513||1556||
|-
|Lord Avondale (1500)||Andrew Stewart, 2nd Lord Avondale||1513||1549||
|-
|Lord Elphinstone (1509)||Alexander Elphinstone, 2nd Lord Elphinstone||1513||1547||
|-
|Lord Methven (1528)||Henry Stewart, 1st Lord Methven||1528||1552||
|-
|}

Peerage of Ireland

|rowspan=2|Earl of Kildare (1316)||Gerald FitzGerald, 9th Earl of Kildare||1513||1534||Died
|-
|Thomas FitzGerald, 10th Earl of Kildare||1534||1537||Title forfeited
|-
|rowspan=2|Earl of Ormond (1328)||Piers Butler, 8th Earl of Ormond||1515||1539||Died
|-
|James Butler, 9th Earl of Ormond||1539||1546||Created Viscount Thurles in 1536
|-
|rowspan=2|Earl of Desmond (1329)||Thomas FitzGerald, 11th Earl of Desmond||1529||1534||
|-
|James FitzGerald, de jure 12th Earl of Desmond||1534||1540||See also John FitzGerald, de facto 12th Earl of Desmond
|-
|rowspan=2|Earl of Waterford (1446)||George Talbot, 4th Earl of Waterford||1473||1538||Died
|-
|Francis Talbot, 5th Earl of Waterford||1538||1560||
|-
|rowspan=2|Viscount Gormanston (1478)||William Preston, 2nd Viscount Gormanston||1503||1532||Died
|-
|Jenico Preston, 3rd Viscount Gormanston||1532||1569||
|-
|Viscount Grane (1536)||Leonard Grey, 1st Viscount Grane||1536||1541||New creation
|-
|Viscount Kilmaule (1537)||Edmond Fitzmaurice, 1st Viscount Kilmaule||1537||1541||New creation
|-
|Baron Athenry (1172)||John de Bermingham||1529||1547||
|-
|rowspan=2|Baron Kingsale (1223)||John de Courcy, 16th Baron Kingsale||1520||1535||
|-
|Gerald de Courcy, 17th Baron Kingsale||1535||1599||
|-
|rowspan=2|Baron Kerry (1223)||Edmond Fitzmaurice, 10th Baron Kerry||1498||1535||Resigned
|-
|Edmond Fitzmaurice, 11th Baron Kerry||1535||1541||Created Viscount Kilmaule, see above
|-
|rowspan=3|Baron Barry (1261)||John Barry, 12th Baron Barry||1500||1530||Died
|-
|John Barry, 13th Baron Barry||1530||1534||Died
|-
|John FitzJohn Barry, 14th Baron Barry||1534||1553||
|-
|Baron Slane (1370)||James Fleming, 9th Baron Slane||1517||1578||
|-
|Baron Howth (1425)||Christopher St Lawrence, 5th Baron Howth||1526||1542||
|-
|Baron Killeen (1449)||John Plunkett, 5th Baron Killeen||1510||1550||
|-
|rowspan=2|Baron Trimlestown (1461)||John Barnewall, 3rd Baron Trimlestown||1513||1538||Died
|-
|Patrick Barnewall, 4th Baron Trimlestown||1538||1562||
|-
|Baron Dunsany (1462)||Robert Plunkett, 5th Baron of Dunsany||1521||1559||
|-
|rowspan=2|Baron Delvin (1486)||Richard Nugent, 1st Baron Delvin||1486||1537||Died
|-
|Richard Nugent, 5th Baron Delvin||1537||1559||
|-
|Baron Kilcullen (1535)||Thomas Eustace, 1st Baron Kilcullen||1535||1549||New creation
|-
|rowspan=2|Baron Power (1535)||Richard Power, 1st Baron Power||1535||1539||New creation; died
|-
|Piers Power, 2nd Baron Power||1539||1545||
|-
|}

References

 

Lists of peers by decade
1530s in England
1530s in Ireland
16th century in England
16th century in Scotland
16th century in Ireland
16th-century English nobility
16th-century Scottish peers
16th-century Irish people
Peers